Madaari  is a 2016 Indian social thriller film directed by Nishikant Kamat. It is produced by Shailesh R Singh, Madan Paliwal, Sutapa Sikdar, and Shailja Kejriwal and co-produced by Nishant Pitti from Easemytrip. The film stars Irrfan Khan, Vishesh Bansal, Jimmy Shergill, Tushar Dalvi and Nitesh Pandey and was released on 22 July 2016. This was Nishikant Kamat's last film as director before his death on 17 August 2020. Upon release, it received positive reviews and was a sleeper hit at the box office, but in later years it became a cult classic.

Plot  
A 10-year-old child, Rohan, is kidnapped from his hostel. Rohan is the only son of the Home Minister. The army and the CBI storm into action. CBI officer Nachiket Verma  heads the case and gets restrain orders from all the other security agencies to make sure that the kidnappers don't panic and kill Rohan. Initially, the case is thought of mistaken identity wherein the kidnapper might have tried to kidnap the friend of Rohan, Cheeku who was also drugged while kidnapping.

For a long time, there is silence from the kidnapper and everyone is left guessing as who it might be, and at the same time the investigation is kept extremely secret, so as to keep the kidnapper(s) from killing Rohan. Behind the scenes, the security agencies try to find the location of the kidnapper without raising any kind of suspicion. Rohan is actually kidnapped by Nirmal after being drugged by him. Rohan shows his anger towards Nirmal for kidnapping him. Nirmal shows Rohan a pre-recorded video of his friend Cheeku who is in a drugged state struggling with fear. Nirmal tells Rohan that Cheeku will be killed if he refuses to co-operate with him. Nirmal keeps traveling via public transport to evade his location.

One day, Nirmal calls Cheeku's father to convey a message to the Home Minister that Rohan was abducted on purpose. His demand is that he wants his son, who was lost in an act of negligence by the government, to be found. It is then revealed that Nirmal had a happy family with his son, Apu (short for Apurva) after his wife left them. Apu died when a bridge collapsed on him on his way to school. Moved and depressed by his loss, Nirmal decided to seek revenge from the politicians and others responsible for the death of his son.

The news becomes a hot item in the media. Towards the end, Nirmal travels back to his house in Mumbai with Rohan, and calls a TV news channel from there and demands all those who were involved in the bridge collapse, including the Home Minister, come to his house and also the news anchor to broadcast it to the people, threatening to kill Rohan and himself if they don't. He makes the bridge contractor, the Home Minister, whose name appears in the initial scenes of the movie as Gilani (stated in a newspaper headline), and the ruling party's money man , confess their corrupt activities on a live broadcast on TV. Rohan indicates he understands why Nirmal did what he did and Rohan and Nirmal hug before Rohan leaves with his father. Nirmal surrenders to the police and is later seen immersing the articles his son was wearing (and the remains of his son in a schoolbag) when he died, in sea while being under the custody of the police.

Cast
 Irrfan Khan as Nirmal Kumar
 Vishesh Bansal as Rohan Goswami
 Jimmy Sheirgill as Nachiket Verma
 Tushar Dalvi as Prashant Goswami a.k.a. "Gilani"
 Uday Tikekar as Pratap Nimbalkar
 Nitesh Pandey as Sanjay Jagtap
 Rajeev Gupta as Mr. Bansal
 Sadhil Kapoor as Cheeku
Ayesha Raza Mishra as Jaya Goswami, Rohan's mother and Prashant's wife

Production

Filming
The film was shot in New Delhi, Rajasthan, Dehradun, Shimla and Mumbai.

Music
The first song "Dama Dama Dam" from Madaari was released on 10 June 2016.
Both Songs Written by Irshad Kamil.

Release

Marketing
The first look poster of the film was unveiled through Twitter by Irrfan Khan and later the teaser of the film was revealed on YouTube on 10 May 2016. The trailer was released by T-Series on 11 May 2016 on YouTube.

Critical reception
On Rotten Tomatoes, the film has an approval rating of 78% based on 9 reviews, and an average rating of 7.6/10.

References

External links
 

2016 films
Films about corruption in India
Indian films based on actual events
Indian thriller films
2010s Hindi-language films
Films set in Delhi
Films directed by Nishikant Kamat
Films set in Dehradun
Films set in Shimla
Films set in Mumbai
Films set in Rajasthan
Films scored by Vishal Bhardwaj
Films about child abduction in India
Films with screenplays by Ritesh Shah
2016 thriller films
Thriller films based on actual events
Hindi-language thriller films